The T4-Gutachter (in English, 'Action T4 experts') were medical experts who were employed by the Zentraldienststelle-T4 to organize and carry out the Action T4 euthanasia program in Nazi Germany. Based on reporting forms with information about the mentally ill and disabled, they decided who would be killed in "euthanasia" centers.  An internal document from the organization shows a list of 40 physicians who were among those who worked for Action T4.

List of Action T4 experts

Copies of the reporting forms were dispatched to three or four of the above experts.  The results were sent to the T4-Zentraldienststelle and presented to one of the three Obergutachter (top experts), who had the final word.

List of Action T4 top experts

List of experts for child euthanasia
There were also three medical experts for the "euthanasia" of children, starting a little before the Action T4 for adults:

References

Bibliography
 Ernst Klee: "Euthanasie" im NS-Staat. Die "Vernichtung lebensunwerten Lebens"; Frankfurt am Main: S. Fischer Verlag, 1983; 
 Götz Aly (Hg.): Aktion T4 1939-1945. Die "Euthanasie"-Zentrale in der Tiergartenstraße 4; Berlin: Edition Hentrich, 1989, 

 
Physicians in the Nazi Party